Amaral is a Spanish rock duo from Zaragoza, who have sold more than four million albums worldwide. The band consists of Eva Amaral (vocals) and Juan Aguirre (guitar), who write their songs together. Amaral and Aguirre met in 1992 in a bar in Zaragoza. She played drums in a local punk rock band called Bandera Blanca and also sang with Acid Rain. Aguirre was playing with a band called Días de Vino y Rosas at the time. Soon after they met, the two decided to play together and perform their own material. In 1997, they moved to Madrid and signed a major deal with EMI. Amaral's musical style is often called pop rock, but it is often fused with Latin beats, folk rock, synthesizers, complex poetic lyrics, and in particular, traditional Spanish folk music. Their distinctive style was described by Juan as folk, "and the person who has heard a lot of folk and traditional music will listen and understand, but I think our attitude to life is rather that of a rock group."

Juan Aguirre was born in San Sebastián (also known as Donostia) in the Guipúzcoa province of Spain. The inspirations for their songs include cinema, friends, and literature. Amaral have won numerous awards including the MTV Europe Music Award for their 2002 album Estrella de mar, which was nominated for 5 other categories, and are one of the best-selling Spanish groups of all time. As of 2019, they have released eight studio albums, one (double) live album, and two live DVDs. According to Eva, they are "a libertarian group that doesn’t think of music as a conquest or a competition... We chose music as a way to break a lifestyle that we didn’t like and a society that we don’t understand."

Collaborations
Amaral has collaborated with many well-known artists in the music industry:
 Álvaro Urquijo, contributions on the album Amaral
 Tony Beard (Mike Oldfield, Mick Jagger), on drums
 Peter Buck, on the song "Doce palabras", from the album Gato Negro Dragón Rojo
 Chetes, on the song "Si Tú No Vuelves", from the album Pajaros en la Cabeza
 Beto Cuevas, on the song "Te Necesito".
 Danny Cummings (Mark Knopfler, Bryan Adams), on percussion
 Melvin Duffyel (Robbie Williams, Sting), on pedal steel guitar
 Echo String Quartet, on strings.
 Antonio Escobar, programming on the album Hacia lo salvaje
 Russell Milton (The Waterboys), on bass
 Moby, on the single "Escapar (Slipping Away)")
 Danny Shogger (George Michael, Paul McCartney), on keyboards
 Pereza, on the Spanish band's 2006 track "La Noria" from the album Los amigos de los animales.
 Ariel Rot, on the 2006 track "Sin saber qué decir" from his 2007 album Dúos, Tríos y Otras Perversiones.

Discography

Studio albums
 Amaral (1998)
 Una pequeña parte del mundo (2000)
 Estrella de mar (2002)
 Pájaros en la cabeza (2005)
 Gato negro◆Dragón rojo  (2008)
 Hacia lo salvaje (2011)
 Nocturnal (2015)
 Salto al color (2019)

References

External links

 

Spanish pop rock music groups
Folk rock groups
Spanish musical duos
Spanish rock music groups
Spanish pop music groups
Spanish indie rock groups
Spanish alternative rock groups
Rock en Español music groups
Discographies of Spanish artists
Musical groups established in 1992
Latin pop music groups
MTV Europe Music Award winners
Sony Music Spain artists